Roger Cooke may refer to:
 Roger Gresham Cooke (1907–1970), British politician
 Roger Cooke (artist) (1941–2012), American artist and muralist
 Roger Cooke (mathematician)

See also
 Roger Cook (disambiguation)